Comedy Knockout is an American standup comedy game show television series. The show debuted on April 21, 2016. It is currently airing on truTV. In the show, which is hosted by Damien Lemon, the contestants attempt to win points with stand up comedy based on audience reaction. A frequent theme is roasting.

References

External links

2010s American stand-up comedy television series
2016 American television series debuts
English-language television shows
Television series by 3 Arts Entertainment
Television series by Embassy Row (production company)
TruTV original programming